Coldwater Creek is an intermittently-flowing stream in northeastern New Mexico, and the panhandles of Oklahoma and Texas. As far back as 1907, the USGS reported that Coldwater Creek is a dry sand bed most of the year. One source says that Coldwater Creek is also known as Rabbit Ears Creek, because it rises near Rabbit Ears, a pair of mountain peaks in Union County, New Mexico.

Stream course
From New Mexico, it enters the south-west corner of Cimarron County, Oklahoma in the Oklahoma Panhandle. It passes easterly through Dallam, Sherman, and Hansford counties in the Texas Panhandle.

Optima Lake
The lake is essentially dry most of the time, because of declining water table levels  and periodic droughts that have affected the panhandles of Oklahoma and Texas. As a result, the lake project (completed in 1978), was largely abandoned in 2010 when picnic tables and other structures were demolished for safety reasons. Public use areas have been left open, but are overgrown by vegetation and without services such as electricity and water. Major improvements have been postponed indefinitely because of budget cuts to the Corps of Engineers.

See also
List of rivers of Oklahoma
List of rivers of Texas
Optima Lake

Notes

References

USGS Geographic Names Information Service
USGS Hydrologic Unit Map - State of Texas (1974)

Rivers of Oklahoma
Rivers of Texas
Rivers of New Mexico
Tributaries of the Arkansas River
Rivers of Cimarron County, Oklahoma
Rivers of Dallam County, Texas
Rivers of Sherman County, Texas
Rivers of Hansford County, Texas
Rivers of Texas County, Oklahoma